Malek may refer to:
 Malek, Kaleybar, East Azerbaijan Province
 Malek, Varzaqan, East Azerbaijan Province
 Malek, Kerman

See also
 Deh-e Malek (disambiguation)
 Malek (disambiguation)
 Malik